Arøya is a group of isles located in the outer part of the Langesund fjord in Norway. The isles, in detail referred to as Store Arøy, Lille Arøy and Vesle Arøy ('Big', 'Small' and 'Tiny' Arøy), are situated approximately midway between the towns of Langesund and Helgeroa in the municipality of Larvik. Arøya is a typical recreational cottage area for the population in the Grenland area as well as cityslickers from the Norwegian capital Oslo a 1,5h drive away. There are still a few families residing on the isles, where fishing is the prime source of income.

In the Summer season a local ferry (Skjæløy) connects Helgeroa with Langesund. The ferry makes several stops on the isles. The trip is frequently used by tourists going roundtrip for a great view of the area. Bikers also use the ferry as a shortcut connection to the southern shores of Norway.

Larvik

Islands of Vestfold og Telemark